Fellow of the UK Institution of Engineering and Technology (FIET) is the highest grade
of Institution of Engineering and Technology membership, awarded to those
who have sustained high levels of achievement, for several years.

Fellows must demonstrates to fulfil at least two of the nine following citeria:
Leadership
Responsibility
Insight and Experience
Creativity
Innovation
Enterprise
Service
Reputation
Influence and Contribution

Applicants must document on their application that their careers and achievements fulfill the above-mentioned
criteria. Applications must be supported by minimum two other existing fellows. Also, Fellow of other international learned society as well as chartered engineer status are
preferred prior to the application for fellow grade in IET. Applicants include senior engineers, researchers, and technology leaders from industry and accomplished professors from universities.

Prior to the name change of IET, fellows have the post-nominal letters of FIEE. Existing fellows of IEE automatically become FIET when the engineering institution changes its name in 2006.

Fellowship
Fellows are entitled to use the post-nominal letters FIET.  examples of fellows include Muffy Calder, Wendy Hall, Andy Hopper, Lajos Hanzo, and Martin Sweeting.  See the :Category:Fellows of the Institution of Engineering and Technology for more examples.

References

British awards
Institution of Engineering and Technology
Academic awards
 
Institution of Engineering and Technology